White Lies (for My Mother) is a non-fiction book, written by Canadian writer Liza Potvin, first published in March 1992 by NeWest Press. In the book, the author chronicles her "lost" childhood, as an incest victim, and the subsequent years of emotional turmoil, leading to recovery.

Awards and honours
 White Lies (for my mother) received the 1993 "Edna Staebler Award for Creative Non-Fiction". The book was also nominated for the 1992 "VanCity Book Award", and The Vancouver Sun's 1992 listing as one of the "Six Best Books of the Year".

See also
List of Edna Staebler Award recipients

References

External links
VIU, Liza Potvin, biography. Retrieved 20 November 2012

Canadian non-fiction books
1992 non-fiction books
Child sexual abuse in Canada
Canadian biographies